Huster is a surname. Notable people with the surname include:

Francis Huster (born 1947), French actor, director, and scriptwriter
Marc Huster (born 1970), German weightlifter and sports commentator

See also
Hester
Huste
Husted